The Vishnu Purana (IAST:) is one of the eighteen Mahapuranas, a genre of ancient and medieval texts of Hinduism. It is an important Pancharatra text in the Vaishnavism literature corpus.

The manuscripts of Vishnu Purana have survived into the modern era in many versions. More than any other major Purana, the Vishnu Purana presents its contents in Pancalaksana format – Sarga (cosmogony), Pratisarga (cosmology), Vamśa (genealogy of the gods, sages and kings), Manvantara (cosmic cycles), and Vamśānucaritam (legends during the times of various kings). Some manuscripts of the text are notable for not including sections found in other major Puranas, such as those on Mahatmyas and tour guides on pilgrimage, but some versions include chapters on temples and travel guides to sacred pilgrimage sites. The text is also notable as the earliest Purana to have been translated and published in 1840 CE by HH Wilson, based on manuscripts then available, setting the presumptions and premises about what Puranas may have been.

The Vishnu Purana is among the shorter Purana texts, with about 7,000 verses in extant versions. It primarily centers around the Hindu god Vishnu and his avatars such as Krishna, but it praises Brahma and Shiva and asserts that they are dependent on Vishnu. The Purana, states Wilson, is pantheistic and the ideas in it, like other Puranas, are premised on the Vedic beliefs and ideas.

Vishnu Purana, like all major Puranas, attributes its author to be sage Veda Vyasa. The actual author(s) and date of its composition are unknown and contested. Estimates of its composition range from 400 BCE to 900 CE. The text was likely composed and rewritten in layers over a period of time, with roots possibly in ancient 1st-millennium BCE texts that have not survived into the modern era. The Padma Purana categorizes Vishnu Purana as a Sattva Purana (Purana that represents goodness and purity).

Date of composition 

The composition date of Vishnu Purana is unknown and contested, with estimates widely disagreeing. Some proposed dates for the earliest version of Vishnu Purana by various scholars include:

 Vincent Smith (1908): 400-300 BCE,
 CV Vaidya (1925): ~9th-century,
 Moriz Winternitz (1932): possibly early 1st millennium, but states Rocher, he added, "it is no more possible to assign a definite date to the Vishnu Purana than it is for any other Purana".
 Rajendra Chandra Hazra (1940): 275-325 CE
 Ramachandra Dikshitar (1951): 700-300 BCE,
 Roy (1968): after the 9th century.
 Horace Hayman Wilson (1864): acknowledged that the tradition believes it to be 1st millennium BCE text and the text has roots in the Vedic literature, but after his analysis suggested that the extant manuscripts may be from the 11th century.
 Wendy Doniger (1988):  450 CE.

Rocher states that the "date of the Vishnu Purana is as contested as that of any other Purana". References to Vishnu Purana in texts such as Brihadvishnu whose dates are better established, states Rocher, suggest that a version of Vishnu Purana existed by about 1000 CE, but it is unclear to what extent the extant manuscripts reflect the revisions during the 2nd millennium. Vishnu Purana like all Puranas has a complicated chronology. Dimmitt and van Buitenen state that each of the Puranas including the Vishnu Purana is encyclopedic in style, and it is difficult to ascertain when, where, why and by whom these were written:

Many of the extant manuscripts were written on palm leaf or copied during the British India colonial era, some in the 19th century. The scholarship on Vishnu Purana, and other Puranas, has suffered from cases of forgeries, states Ludo Rocher, where liberties in the transmission of Puranas were normal and those who copied older manuscripts replaced words or added new content to fit the theory that the colonial scholars were keen on publishing.

Structure
The extant text comprises six  (parts) and 126  (chapters). The first part has 22 chapters, the second part consists 16 chapters, the third part comprises 18 chapters and the fourth part has 24 chapters. The fifth and the sixth parts are the longest and the shortest part of the text, comprising 38 and 8 chapters respectively.

The textual tradition claims that the original Vishnu Purana had 23,000 verses, but the surviving manuscripts have just a third of these, about 7,000 verses. The text is composed in metric verses or sloka, wherein each verse has exactly 32 syllables, of which 16 syllables in the verse may be free style per ancient literary standards.

The Vishnu Purana is an exception in that it presents its contents in Vishnu worship-related Pancalaksana format – Sarga (Cosmogony), Pratisarga (Cosmology), Vamsa (Mythical genealogy of the gods, sages, and kings), Manvantara (Cosmic Cycles), and Vamsanucaritam (Legends During The Times Of Various Kings). This is rare, state Dimmitt and van Buitenen, because just 2% of the known Puranic literature corpus is about these five Pancalaksana items, and about 98% is about diverse range of encyclopedic topics.

Contents 

Vishnu Purana opens as a conversation between sage Maitreya and his Guru, Parashara, with the sage asking, "What Is The Nature Of This Universe And Everything That Is In It?"

First Amsa: Cosmology
The first Amsha (part) of Vishnu Purana presents cosmology, dealing with the creation, maintenance and destruction of the universe. The mythology, states Rocher, is woven with the evolutionary theories of Samkhya school of Hindu philosophy.

The Hindu god Vishnu is presented as the central element of this text's cosmology, unlike some other Puranas where Shiva or Brahma or goddess Shakti are offered prominence. The reverence and the worship of Vishnu is described in 22 chapters of the first part as the means for liberation, along with the profuse use of the synonymous names of Vishnu such as Hari, Janardana, Madhava, Achyuta, Hrishikesha and others. The chapters 1.16 through 1.20 of the Vishnu Purana presents the legend of compassionate and Vishnu devotee Prahlada and his persecution by his demon king father Hiranyakasipu, wherein Prahlada is ultimately saved by Vishnu when Vishnu's Narashima avatar kills Hiranyakashipu. This story is also found in other Puranas.

Vishnu is described in the first book of Vishnu Purana as, translates Wilson, all elements, all matter in the world, the entire universe, all living beings, as well as Atman (Inner Self, essence) within every living being, nature, intellect, ego, mind, senses, ignorance, wisdom, the four Vedas, all that is and all that is not.

Second Amsa: Earth
The second part of the text describes its theory of earth, the seven continents and seven oceans. It describes Mount Meru, Mount Mandara and other major mountains, as well as Bharata Varsha (Literally, the country of Bharata) along with its numerous rivers and diverse people. The seven continents are named Jambu, Plaksha, Salmala, Kusha, Krauncha, Saka, and Pushkara, each surrounded by different types of liquids (salt water, fresh water, wine, sugarcane juice, clarified butter, liquid yoghurt, And milk).

This part of the Vishnu Purana describes spheres above the Earth, planets, the Sun And the Moon. Four Chapters (2.13 to 2.16) of the second book of the text present the legends of King Bharat, who abdicates his throne to lead the life of a Sannyasi, which is similar to the legends found in section 5.7 to 5.14 of the Bhagavata Purana. The geography of Mount Mandara as east of Mount Meru, presented in this book and other Puranas, states Stella Kramrisch, may be related to the word Mandir (Hindu Temple) and the reason of its Design, "Image, Aim And Destination".

Third Amsa: Time
The initial chapters of the third book of the Vishnu Purana presents its theory of Manvantaras, or Manus-ages (each 306.72 Million Years Long). This is premised upon the Hindu belief that everything is Cyclic, And Even Yuga (Era, Ages) start, mature and then dissolve. Six manvantaras, states the text, have already passed, and the current age belong to the seventh. In each age, asserts the text, the Vedas are arranged into four, it is challenged, and this has happened twenty eight times already. Each time, a Veda Vyasa appears and he diligently organizes the eternal knowledge, with the aid of his students.

After presenting the emergence of Vedic schools, the text presents the ethical duties of the four Varnas in chapter 2.8, the four Ashrama (Stages) of the life of each human being in chapter 2.9, the rites of passage including wedding rituals in chapters 2.10 through 2.12, and Shraddha (Ancestral rites) in chapters 2.13 through 2.16.

The Vishnu Purana asserts that the Brahmin should study the Shastras, worship gods and perform libations on behalf of others, the Kshatriya should maintain arms and protect the earth, the Vaishya should engage in commerce and farming, while the Shudra should subsist by profits of trade, service other varnas and through mechanical labor. The text asserts the ethical duties of all Varnas is to do good to others, never abuse anyone, never engage in calumny or untruth, never covet another person's wife, never steal another's property, never bear ill-will towards anyone, never beat or slay any human being or living being. Be diligent in the service of the gods, sages and guru, asserts the Purana, and seek the welfare of all creatures, one's own children and of one's own soul. Anyone, regardless of their varna or stage of life, who lives a life according to the above duties is the best worshipper of Vishnu, claims the Vishnu Purana. Similar statements on ethical duties of man are found in other parts of Vishnu Purana.

The text describes in chapter 2.9, the four stages of life as Brahmacharya (Student), Grihastha (Householder), Vanaprastha (Retirement) and Sannyasa (Renunciation, Mendicant). The text repeats the ethical duties in this chapter, translates Wilson. The chapters on Shraddha (Rites For Ancestors) describe the rites associated with a death in family, the preparation of the dead body, its cremation and the rituals after the cremation.

The third book closes with the Legend Of Vishnu, through Mayamoha, helping the Devas win over Asuras, by teaching the Asuras heretical doctrines that deny the Vedas, who declare their contempt for the Vedas, which makes them easy to identify and thereby defeat.

Fourth Amsa: Dynasties
The fourth book of the text, in 24 long chapters, presents royal dynasties, starting with Brahma, followed by solar and lunar dynasties, then those on earth over the Yugas (eras), with Pariksit asserted as the "current king". The text includes the legends of numerous characters such as Shaubhri, Mandhatri, Narmada, sage Kapila, Rama, Nimi, Janaka, Buddha, Satyavati, Puru, Yadu, Krishna, Devaka, Pandu, Kuru, Bharata, Bhisma, and others.

Fifth Amsa: Krishna
The fifth book of the Vishnu Purana is the longest, with 38 chapters. It is dedicated to the Legend Of Krishna, as an incarnation of Vishnu. The book begins with the story of Krishna's Birth, His Childhood Pranks And Plays, His Exploits, His Purpose Of Ending The Tyranny Of Demon-Tyrant King Of Mathura, Named Kans.

The Krishna story in the Vishnu Purana is similar to his legend in the Bhagavata Purana, in several other Puranas and the Harivamsa of the Mahabharata. Scholars have long debated whether the Bhagavata Purana expanded the Krishna Legend in the Vishnu Purana, or whether the latter abridged the version in former, or both depended on the Harivamsa estimated to have been composed sometime in the 1st millennium of the common era.

Sixth Amsa: Liberation

The last book of the Vishnu Purana is the shortest, with 8 chapters. The first part of the sixth book asserts that Kali Yuga is vicious, cruel and filled with evilness that create suffering, yet "Kali Yuga is excellent" because one can refuse to join the evil, devote oneself to Vishnu and thus achieve salvation.

The last chapters, from 6.6 to 6.7 of the text discusses Yoga and meditation, as a means to Vishnu devotion. Contemplative devotion, asserts the text, is the union with the Brahman (supreme soul, ultimate reality), which is only achievable with virtues such as compassion, truth, honesty, disinterestedness, self-restraint and holy studies. The text mentions five Yamas, five Niyamas, Pranayama and Pratyahara. The pure and perfect soul is called Vishnu, states the text, and absorption in Vishnu is liberation.

The final chapter 6.8 of the text asserts itself to be an "imperishable Vaishnava Purana".

Critical edition 
A Critical Edition of the Sanskrit text of the Visnu-purana was published in two large volumes, 1997 and 1999. A critical edition is prepared by comparing a number of different manuscripts, recording their variant readings in notes, and choosing the best readings to constitute the text of the critical edition. This is a real, large-scale critical edition, in which 43 Sanskrit manuscripts were gathered and collated, and 27 were chosen from which to prepare the Sanskrit edition. It is: 

The Critical Edition of the Visnupuranam, edited by M. M. Pathak, 2 vols., Vadodara: Oriental Institute, 1997, 1999.

All scholars citing translations of Sanskrit texts are expected to refer to the Sanskrit original, because translations are inexact. From 1999 onward, anyone citing the Visnu-purana will be expected to refer to this Sanskrit critical edition.

A translation of the critical edition was published in 2021 under the title, The Visnu Purana: Ancient Annals of the God with Lotus Eyes.

Influences 
Vishnu Purana is one of the 18 major Puranas, and these text share many legends, likely influenced each other. The fifth chapter of the Vishnu Purana was likely influenced by the Mahabharata. Similarly, the verses on rites of passage and ashramas (stages) of life are likely drawn from the Dharmasutra literature. Rajendra Hazra, in 1940, assumed that Vishnu Purana is ancient and proposed that texts such as Apasthamba Dharmasutra borrowed text from it. Modern scholars such as Allan Dahlaquist disagree, however, and state that the borrowing may have been in the other direction, from Dharmasutras into the Purana.

Other chapters, particularly those in book 5 and 6 of the Vishnu Purana have Advaita Vedanta and Yoga influences. The theistic Vedanta scholar Ramanuja, according to Sucharita Adluri, incorporated ideas from the Vishnu Purana to identify the Brahman concept in the Upanishads with Vishnu, thus providing a Vedic foundation to the Srivaishnava tradition.

See also
Dvaita Vedanta
Hindu texts
Upanishads
Vedas

Notes

References

Bibliography

Further reading
Mani, Vettam. Puranic Encyclopedia. 1st English ed. New Delhi: Motilal Banarsidass, 1975.
Shri Vishnupuran published by Gitapress Gorakhpur

External links
The Viṣṇu Purāṇa: Ancient Annals of the God with Lotus Eyes translation by McComas Taylor
Vishnu Purana translation by H.H. Wilson at sacred-texts
Vishnu Purana English translation correct IAST transliteration and glossary
Other language versions on the Internet Archive: Sanskrit (by Vishnuchitta Alwar, 1922), Bengali by Kaliprasanna Vidyaratna (1926), Hindi, Telugu by K. Bhavanarayana (1930)
Read Critical Edition of Vishnu Purana by Vadodara: Oriental Institute

Puranas
Vaishnava texts